Cheuk Yuen Victoria Poon (Chinese name 潘卓源) (born October 12, 1984) is a Canadian competitive swimmer who specialises in freestyle events. She was born in Hong Kong. She moved to Canada when she was 11 years old.  She lives in the LaSalle borough of Montreal, Quebec.  She is the former national record holder in the women's 50m freestyle, with a time of 24.75s.

Career
Poon's long time swim club has been the Club de natation Calac de LaSalle.

In 2005, Poon set the Canadian national record for women's 50-metre freestyle, at 25.52 seconds.

Poon competed at the 2006 Commonwealth Games, and won a bronze with the Canadian team in the women's 4x100-metre freestyle relay.

In the April 2008 Canadian Olympic Trials, Poon lowered her Canadian record for women's 50-metre freestyle to 25.47 seconds, which she has set in 2005.  At the 2008 Canadian Summer Open Nationals, she finished 3rd in the women's 50m freestyle event, behind Jennifer Carroll (2nd) and Jen Beckberger (1st).

Poon competed at the 2008 Summer Olympics and finished 30th in the women's 50-metre freestyle event.

In 2009, Poon set the women's 50-metre freestyle Canadian record at 24.75 seconds.
On 19 June 2009, Poon set a new Canadian record for the women's 50m butterfly, of 26.71s, at the Canada Cup of swimming; besting the record set Shona Kitson in 2000 of 27.17s. At that time, Poon was coached by Benoît Lebrun, of the Club de natation des piscines du Parc olympique (CNPPO; literally, Olympic Park Swimming Pools Swim Club).

At the 2010 Canada Cup of Swimming, short course, Poon won gold for the women's 100-metre freestyle, and 50-metre butterfly.  At the time, she was also the Canadian national record holder for those two events.

At the 2010 World Swimming Championships, short course, Poon set and then bettered the Canadian national record for women's 100-metre freestyle. She set a new record on 16 December 2010 of 52.76 seconds in the semi-finals. On December 17, 2010, in the finals, she reset it to 52.51 seconds, and managed to finish fifth. In the 50m freestyle, she lowered her own Canadian record to 29.14s. She ended with a 7th-place ranking.

In the March 2011 Canadian World Championship Trials, Poon finished second, behind Julia Wilkinson, in the women's 100m freestyle race.

Poon competed at the 2012 Summer Olympics and finished 16th in the women's 50-metre freestyle event.

Personal bests

See also
 List of World Aquatics Championships medalists in swimming (women)
 List of Commonwealth Games medallists in swimming (women)
 World record progression 4 × 100 metres medley relay

References

1984 births
Living people
Canadian female freestyle swimmers
Hong Kong emigrants to Canada
Olympic swimmers of Canada
People from LaSalle, Quebec
Swimmers from Montreal
Swimmers at the 2006 Commonwealth Games
Swimmers at the 2008 Summer Olympics
Swimmers at the 2012 Summer Olympics
Swimmers at the 2014 Commonwealth Games
World Aquatics Championships medalists in swimming
Commonwealth Games bronze medallists for Canada
Commonwealth Games medallists in swimming
Medallists at the 2006 Commonwealth Games
Medallists at the 2014 Commonwealth Games